Plesiocystiscus alfredensis, common name the blue oval marginella, is a species of very small sea snail, a marine gastropod mollusk in the family Cystiscidae.

This species occurs throughout the Indo-Pacific Oceans. It prefer to live in sheltered areas.

External links
Plesiocystiscus alfredensis info

Cystiscidae
Gastropods described in 1915